Jaconelli is a surname. Notable people with the surname include:

 Charlotte Jaconelli (born 1995) British actress and Singer
 Emilio Jaconelli (born 1983), Scottish footballer
 Ernesto Jaconelli (1917–1999), piano accordion player